Kevin Roderick Feely (born 30 August 1992) is an Irish former professional footballer and Gaelic footballer for Kildare and Athy. His younger brother Rory Feely is a professional footballer.

Career
Feely began his career with Bohemians in 2010, signed by Pat Fenlon, however it was under Aaron Callaghan that he became a regular first-team member in 2012. His performances attracted the attention of a number of overseas clubs, with both Peterborough United  and Everton amongst his rumoured suitors. However, Feely signed for Charlton Athletic in November 2012. On 8 August 2013 he joined Carlisle United on a 28-day loan. Feely made his professional debut on 10 August 2013 in a 4–0 defeat at Bradford City.

On 25 November 2013 Feely joined AFC Wimbledon on loan until 4 January. On 21 March 2014 he joined Newport County on loan. He made his debut for Newport in the league two match versus Torquay United on 22 March. Feely scored his first football league goal for Newport versus Rochdale on 3 May 2014.

On 22 May 2014, he was released from Charlton Athletic, and on 30 May 2014 signed a permanent contract with Newport County. On 1 September 2015 his Newport contract was cancelled by mutual consent so that Feely could return to full-time education.

Feely now plays senior Gaelic football for Athy and the Kildare county team.

On 25 October 2017, Feely was named in the Ireland squad for the 2017 International Rules Series against Australia in November.

References

External links

1992 births
Living people
Footballers from Brussels
Republic of Ireland association footballers
Association football defenders
Belvedere F.C. players
Bohemian F.C. players
Charlton Athletic F.C. players
Carlisle United F.C. players
AFC Wimbledon players
Newport County A.F.C. players
English Football League players
Athy Gaelic footballers
Gaelic footballers who switched code
Kildare inter-county Gaelic footballers